Ferenc Erdei (24 December 1910 – 11 May 1971) was a Hungarian politician and sociologist, who served as Interior Minister in the unofficial interim government led by Béla Miklós. After the Soviet occupation of Hungary this cabinet took office officially, in March 1945.

Communist period
Under communist rule, Erdei served as minister of agriculture in 1949–53. As such he was responsible for the "attic sweepings" and other coercive happenings and atrocities in the villages. In July 1953 he was appointed minister of justice.

1956 Revolution
Erdei became a deputy prime minister during the Hungarian Revolution of 1956, and as such was one of the leaders of the Hungarian delegation who negotiated abortively with the Soviets. On 3 November he was arrested together with Minister of Defence Pál Maléter, but after some weeks Erdei was released after an intervention by János Kádár.

Later posts
In 1957 he became secretary-general of the Hungarian Academy of Sciences. He received a Kossuth Prize twice, in 1948 and 1962. He was also secretary-general of the National Council of the Patriotic People's Front between 1964 and 1970.

References

1910 births
1971 deaths
People from Makó
People from the Kingdom of Hungary
National Peasant Party (Hungary) politicians
Members of the Hungarian Socialist Workers' Party
Hungarian Interior Ministers
Justice ministers of Hungary
Agriculture ministers of Hungary
Members of the National Assembly of Hungary (1945–1947)
Members of the National Assembly of Hungary (1947–1949)
Members of the National Assembly of Hungary (1949–1953)
Members of the National Assembly of Hungary (1953–1958)
Members of the National Assembly of Hungary (1958–1963)
Members of the National Assembly of Hungary (1963–1967)
Members of the National Assembly of Hungary (1967–1971)
Members of the Hungarian Academy of Sciences
People of the Hungarian Revolution of 1956